This is a list of radio stations that broadcast on FM frequency 105.2 MHz:

Afghanistan 
 Radio Afghanistan in Kabul

Burkina Faso 
 Ouaga FM in Ouagadougou

China 
 CNR The Voice of China in Xiamen
 CNR Business Radio in Linfen
 Guangzhou Traffic Radio in Guangzhou

Isle of Man 
 Energy FM at Ballasaig

Luxembourg 
 Bel RTL in Neufchâteau

Republic of Ireland 
 Phantom FM in Dublin

United Kingdom 
 Greatest Hits West Midlands 
 105.2 Smooth Radio in Glasgow
 Wave 105

References

Lists of radio stations by frequency